was a Japanese diver who competed in the 1932 Summer Olympics. In 1932 he finished sixth in the 3 metre springboard event.

References

External links
 

1908 births
Year of death missing
Japanese male divers
Olympic divers of Japan
Divers at the 1932 Summer Olympics
20th-century Japanese people